Charles Henri Pille (4 January 1844 – 4 March 1897) was a French painter and illustrator.

Life

Charles Henri Pille was born in Essômes-sur-Marne, Aisne, on 4 January 1844.
He studied under Félix-Joseph Barrias.
He submitted his first painting to the Salon in 1865.
In 1869 he received the Gold Medal of the Ministry of the Emperor's household and of Fine Arts. 
He was awarded a gold medal at the Paris Exposition of 1889.

He was recognized by the artistic community of Montmartre.
His work developed with historical scenes and genre scenes that were often tinged with humor. He is best known for his pen drawings.
He made numerous illustrations for publishers, particularly Alphonse Lemerre.
He contributed to magazines and newspapers such as Le Courrier Français, Le Rire, Le Monde illustré, Le Procope, Journal amusant, La Vie moderne, Le Voleur and Le Petit Français illustré.
He published drawings in the review of Le Chat Noir cabaret, and helped design its silhouettes for its shadow theater shows.

In his letters to his brother Théo, Vincent van Gogh repeatedly expressed his admiration for the work of Henri Pille whom he met during his stay in Paris between May 1875 and March 1876.
Henri Pille became a Knight of the Legion of Honour in 1882.
He was president of the Society of Illustrators.
He died in Paris on 4 March 1897.

Books illustrated by Henri Pille 

 Complete Works of Shakespeare, Paris, Alphonse Lemerre, 1875–1880
 Works of Alfred de Musset, Paris, Alphonse Lemerre, 1876
 Voyages en famille, Joseph-Charles Vendryes, Paris, Ludovic Baschet, 1877
 Les dames galantes, Brantôme, Paris, éditions Arnaud et Labat, 1879
 Bleuette, Conte en vers, François Coppée, Paris, Alphonse Lemerre, 1880
 Le livre des convalescents, Ernest Alexandre Honoré Coquelin (under the pseudonym Pirouette), Paris, Tresse, 1880
 Les Contes, Charles Perrault, Paris, Alphonse Lemerre, 1880
 Marie, Paris, Auguste Brizeux, Alphonse Lemerre, 1881
 Le Roman comique, Paul Scarron, Paris, Alphonse Lemerre, 1881
 Quentin Durward, Walter Scott, Paris, Librairie de Firmin-Didot & Cie, 1881
 Fariboles, Ernest Alexandre Honoré Coquelin (under the pseudonym Pirouette), Paris, Paul Ollendorf, 1882
 Les Cinq Sous d'Isaac Laquedem – Le Juif Errant – Contes et histoires pour enfants, Aimé Giron, Paris,  Librairie Firmin-Didot, 1883.
 Derniers contes bleus, Édouard Laboulaye, Paris, Jouvet et Cie, 1884
 Selected works: Tales of the Merovingian times, Augustin Thierry, Paris, Léon Bonhoure, 1885
 Chansons et rondes enfantines, Jean-Baptiste Weckerlin, Garnier Frères, 1885
 Nouvelles Chansons et rondes enfantines, Jean-Baptiste Weckerlin, Garnier Frères, 1886
 II était une fois..., Savinien Lapointe, Paris, Alphonse Lemerre, 1886
 Notre-Dame de Paris, Victor Hugo, Paris, Alphonse Lemerre, 1886
 Histoire merveilleuse de Pierre Schlémihl, ou l'Homme qui a vendu son ombre, Adelbert von Chamisso, Paris, L. Westhausser, 1888.
 Héros légendaires, leur véritable histoire, Ernest d'Hervilly] Paris, Alphonse Lemerre, 1889
 Pages d'autrefois, Roger Miles, Paris A. Lanier & fils, 1889
 Ma petite sœur Naïk, Charles Delon, Paris, Alphonse Lemerre, 1891
 Histoire du célèbre Pépé, Edgar Monteil, Paris, Librairie de l'éducation de la jeunesse, 1891
 Soldats de France, actions héroïques, Gaston de Raimes, Paris, Alphonse Lemerre, 1892–1895
 Les Maris de Colette, Georges Bureau, Paris, Paul Ollendorff, 1895
 La Souris blanche, Hégésippe Moreau, Paris, Pairault & Cie éditeurs, 1895
 Les expédients de Farandole, Pierre Perrault, Paris, Armand Colin, 1895
 Le Chevalier Carême, Marc Guéchot, Paris, colin, 1896
 Don Quichotte de la Manche, Miguel de Cervantes, Charavay, Mantoux et Martin, c. 1893
  Théâtre choisi, Molière, preface by Léo Claretie, Paris, Charavay, Mantoux et Martin, c. 1900
 Twenty Children's Pieces for Piano, Francis Thomé, Henri Lemoine, undated

Public Collections 
 The Louvre, department of graphic arts
 Musée d'Orsay
 Carnavalet Museum, Cantine municipale pendant le siège de Paris, 1870–1871
 National Museum of Château de Pau, drawing of the history of Henry IV of France
 Musée des Beaux-Arts de Nice, Puritains et cavaliers
 Museum of Fine Arts, Rheims, La messe à Pavant (Aisne)

Bibliography 
J. B. Wemsill, « Silhouettes contemporaines » in L'Art, Revue hebdomadaire illusrée, A. Ballue éditeur, 17 September 1876, 90,

References

External links 
 Nécrologie et notice biographique par Frédéric Henriet

1844 births
1897 deaths
French illustrators
19th-century French painters